Amber Morley is a Canadian politician who has represented Ward 3 Etobicoke—Lakeshore on Toronto City Council since 2022.

Background 
Prior to her election to council, Morley worked at the LAMP Community Health Centre, and as an administrative assistant to former councillor Peter Milczyn. In 2017, she was a recipient of the Queen Elizabeth II Diamond Jubilee Medal for her work with LAMP.

Political career 
Morley ran in the 2018 Toronto municipal election in Ward 3 Etobicoke—Lakeshore, coming in second to Grimes.

She ran again in the 2022 municipal election and was elected. Morley received a number of endorsements from progressive politicians including Toronto—St. Paul's Councillor Josh Matlow, former New Democratic  Peggy Nash, as well as Ontario New Democratic  Kristyn Wong-Tam, Bhutila Karpoche and Jill Andrew.

Electoral record

References 

Toronto city councillors
Women municipal councillors in Canada
21st-century Canadian politicians
21st-century Canadian women politicians
Women in Ontario politics
Black Canadian politicians
Black Canadian women
Living people
Year of birth missing (living people)